is a Japanese biathlete. She competed at the 2002 Winter Olympics and the 2006 Winter Olympics.

References

1975 births
Living people
Biathletes at the 2002 Winter Olympics
Biathletes at the 2006 Winter Olympics
Japanese female biathletes
Olympic biathletes of Japan
Place of birth missing (living people)
Asian Games medalists in biathlon
Biathletes at the 2003 Asian Winter Games
Biathletes at the 2007 Asian Winter Games
Asian Games gold medalists for Japan
Asian Games silver medalists for Japan
Asian Games bronze medalists for Japan
Medalists at the 2003 Asian Winter Games
Medalists at the 2007 Asian Winter Games
21st-century Japanese women